Kamianka is a town in the Cherkasy Raion of Cherkasy Oblast of Ukraine. It hosts the administration of Kamianka urban hromada, one of the hromadas of Ukraine. It had a population of 

Government 
Until 18 July, 2020, Kamianka served as an administrative center of Kamianka Raion. The raion was abolished in July 2020 as part of the administrative reform of Ukraine, which reduced the number of raions of Cherkasy Oblast to four. The area of the Kamianka Raion was merged into the Cherkasy Raion.

History 
Kamianka is known as an artist's colony, in which Prince Grigory Potemkin, the Russian national poet Alexander Pushkin, the composer Pyotr Ilyich Tchaikovsky, and other freethinkers and war heroes during the Napoleonic Wars era worked. Kamianka was also one of the chief centres of the Southern Society of the Decembrists.

Culture 
Kamianka has its own historical-cultural open-air museum with monument-protected constructions, collections and parks.

See also 

 List of cities in Ukraine

Gallery

References

External links 
 Official site of Kamianka
 
 

Cities in Cherkasy Oblast
Chigirinsky Uyezd
Pyotr Ilyich Tchaikovsky
Alexander Pushkin
Cities of district significance in Ukraine